Benjamin Michael Paulsen (born October 27, 1987) is an American former Major League Baseball first baseman and left fielder who played for the Colorado Rockies from 2014 to 2016.

Amateur career
Born in Plymouth, Wisconsin, but raised in Alabama and Georgia, Paulsen attended Kell High School in Marietta, Georgia. Paulsen attended Clemson University alongside future major league teammate Kyle Parker. In 2008, he played collegiate summer baseball with the Hyannis Mets of the Cape Cod Baseball League and was named a league all-star. Paulsen's performance and play improved dramatically during his time at Clemson. 6'3 and weighing only 180 lbs. during his freshman season, Paulsen batted .258 and hit five home runs. However, by the time he was a junior and in his final season, a bigger and stronger Paulsen hit. 368 with 11 home runs.

Professional career

Colorado Rockies
Paulsen was drafted by the Colorado Rockies as a first baseman in the third round of the 2009 Major League Baseball Draft. Paulsen was an Arizona Fall League Rising Star in 2011.

In 2014, while playing for the Colorado Springs Sky Sox of the Class AAA Pacific Coast League (PCL), Paulsen was named to the PCL team for the Triple-A All-Star Game. The Rockies promoted Paulsen to the majors for the first time on July 21, 2014, and he made his debut that day. However, MLB recognizes Paulsen's official debut as May 22, 2014, as he entered a game against the San Francisco Giants that started that day but was suspended due to rain and resumed on September 1, collecting a single (which counts as his first big league hit) in his only at-bat. Paulsen finished the 2014 season with a slash line of .317/.348/.571 in 66 plate appearances, hitting 4 home runs and driving in 10.

Minnesota Twins

He signed with the Minnesota Twins for the 2017 season. He was released by the Twins on May 15, 2017.

Post-playing career
In July 2017, Paulsen returned to Clemson to finish his degree, also joining the baseball team as an assistant coach. Paulsen shared a house with former Rockies teammate Kyle Parker while finishing his degree.

References

External links

1987 births
Living people
Colorado Rockies players
Clemson Tigers baseball players
Hyannis Harbor Hawks players
Tri-City Dust Devils players
Modesto Nuts players
Tulsa Drillers players
Salt River Rafters players
Colorado Springs Sky Sox players
Baseball players from Wisconsin
People from Plymouth, Wisconsin
Major League Baseball first basemen
Albuquerque Isotopes players